"Still Valley" is episode 76 of the American television anthology series The Twilight Zone.

Opening narration

The narration continues after dialogue between Paradine and Dauger.

Plot
During the Civil War, two Confederate Army soldiers have been assigned to scout on the Union Army that is marching into the valley below. Sergeant Joseph Paradine hears the army approaching, but suddenly the sound stops. He decides to descend into the valley to see the cause for himself. His companion refuses to accompany him.

When Paradine gets into town, he finds the army there, but all of them are motionless, frozen in time. He tries unsuccessfully to wake them. Finally he comes across an old man named Teague, the sole remaining inhabitant of the town, who is unaffected by the strange phenomenon. Teague claims to be a "witch-man" and says he used a magic spell to freeze the soldiers. Paradine does not believe him, so Teague casts the spell on Paradine, freezing him.

When Teague lifts the spell on Paradine, he claims that he could stop the entire Union Army in this manner, ensuring the success of the Confederacy. Paradine asks why he doesn't, and Teague replies that he is dying and will be dead by the day's end. He gives his book of spells to Paradine, encouraging him to use it, but when Paradine looks in it, he realizes that using this magic requires one to align himself with Satan, which Teague acknowledges.

Teague dies, and Paradine returns to camp to tell his superior about what happened. The superior doesn't believe him and encourages him to get some rest. When another scout returns with the same story, the superior realizes Paradine is telling the truth. Paradine relates the story about the old man, the spell book, and making a deal with the devil. The superior officer decides that the devil is the only one who can help them win the war and encourages Paradine to read from the book.

Paradine discovers that using the book's magic requires that not only must he praise the name of the Devil, but he must renounce the name of God. Rather than do either, Paradine says that if the Confederacy is to die, let it be buried in hallowed ground; he throws the book into a fire.

Closing narration

Cast
 Gary Merrill as Sergeant Joseph Paradine
 Vaughn Taylor as Teague
 Ben Cooper as Dauger
 Mark Tapscott as Lieutenant 
 Jack Mannas as Mallory

Episode notes
The episode is based on a 1939 short story, "The Valley Was Still" by Manly Wade Wellman.
In the original story, the spell on the soldiers is broken when the book is burned.

References
DeVoe, Bill. (2008). Trivia from The Twilight Zone. Albany, GA: Bear Manor Media. 
Grams, Martin. (2008). The Twilight Zone: Unlocking the Door to a Television Classic. Churchville, MD: OTR Publishing.

External links

1961 American television episodes
Television episodes written by Rod Serling
The Twilight Zone (1959 TV series season 3) episodes
Television episodes about the American Civil War
Television episodes about witchcraft
Television episodes about Satanism
Television shows based on short fiction
Fiction set in 1863